Juan Carlos Ferrero was the defending champion but decided not to participate due to knee and wrist injuries.
Nicolás Almagro won his second title of the year, defeating Juan Ignacio Chela 6–3, 3–6, 6–4 in the final.

Seeds

Qualifying

Draw

Finals

Top half

Bottom half

References
 Main Draw
 Qualifying Draw

Copa Claro - Singles
2011 - Singles